Adabar is a Thana of Dhaka District located on the bank of Buriganga river, in Bangladesh. To the north, there is Darus Salam Thana and Sher-e-Bangla Nagar, to the east and south, there is Mohammadpur Thana and to the west, there is Buriganga river.

History
Administration Adabar thana was formed on 27 June 2007 comprising part of Mohammadpur Thana.

See also
Mohammadpur Thana
Dhaka
Bangladesh

References

Thanas of Dhaka